Nathalie Delon (born Francine Canovas, also known as Nathalie Barthélémy; 1 August 194121 January 2021) was a French actress, model, film director and writer. In the 1960s, Nathalie was regarded as one of the most beautiful women in the world and in the 1970s, she was known as a French sex symbol. She is notable for her first acting role, appearing opposite her husband, actor Alain Delon, in the neo-noir film Le Samouraï directed by Jean-Pierre Melville (1967). She appeared in 30 films and directed two more. Nathalie was also credited as the muse of the Rolling Stones.

Early life 
Francine Canovas was born on 1 August 1941 in Oujda, then under the French Protectorate in Morocco to a French family of Italian-Spanish origin. She was the daughter of Louis Canovas (1915–2003), pied-noir of Oran (Algeria), manager of a transport company in Morocco, who abandoned the family when she was 8-months-old in 1942 and Antoinette Rodriguez, who was from Melilla. Nathalie had a sister, Louisette, and a brother.

Personal life 
In 1957, Nathalie married for the first time to a conscript from the north of France, Guy Barthélémy, who later become the signing officer of the Omnium Marocain d'Assurance. They lived in Morocco and had a daughter named Nathalie Barthélémy. They broke up in 1960 and she moved to Paris in 1961. Their divorce was granted in July 1964.

In August 1962, Nathalie met the French actor Alain Delon at New Jimmy's, a Paris nightclub, and they began a secret relationship that night that lasted one year. In May 1963, Nathalie accompanied Delon on the shooting of his new film La Tulipe Noire. In April 1964 they had a great engagement and on 13 August 1964, Nathalie and Alain got married in the Loir-et-Cher. Their son, Anthony Delon, was born on September 30, 1964 at Cedars-Sinai Medical Center in Los Angeles. They were one of the most glamorous and talked about couples of the '60s. In June 1968, Nathalie broke up with Delon. The couple divorced on 14 February 1969. They collaborated on two films: Le Samouraϊ (while they were married) and Doucement les Basses (some years after their separation).

During the '60s and '70s she dated Bobby Keys, Marc Porel, Eddie Fisher, Renaud Verley, Louis Malle and Franco Nero, among others. Her greatest love was Chris Blackwell with whom she formed a couple for 15 years (1978–1993).

Career 
During the 1960s, Nathalie Delon was a model. She photographed by top French and foreign photographers for famous magazines such as Vogue.

In 1967, Nathalie became a film actress, starring opposite her husband in the film Le Samouraï by Jean-Pierre Melville, which became a hit. Writing of the Delons' performances in Le Figaro, Bertrand Guyard notes husband and wife are both nearly silent but "their gazes, fraught with meaning, are enough to thrill the camera" with the director drawing from their portrayals "a mythical couple in the seventh art."

Thereafter, Nathalie Delon continued her acting career until the 1980s. In 1968 she appeared in The Private Lesson which made her a star in Japan ranking her in the top 10 foreign actresses. In 1971 she appeared in When Eight Bells Toll with Anthony Hopkins and in 1972 she appeared in The Monk with Franco Nero. In 1973, she appeared in Le Sex Shop, her turn one of the film's "moments of real pleasure" as one of its "really marvelous girls", Roger Greenspun wrote in The New York Times.

In addition to acting in 30 films in her career, she also directed two,  in 1982 and Sweet Lies in 1988. They Call It an Accident, which Delon directed and wrote, is the story of a mother whose son dies in surgery.

Later life 
In 2006, Delon published a memoir, Pleure pas, c'est pas grave (Don't cry, it's okay). Le Figaro described it as an account of "her shadowy period, her marriage to Delon, her descent into hell with drugs. But still full of life, she also recounts the exceptional encounters she has had with people who made her laugh and who make us laugh by proxy. Delightful and entertaining anecdotes".

Nathalie Delon died at the age of 79, on 21 January 2021 in Paris, from pancreatic cancer.

Filmography

Television

Publications

Novel

Memoir

References

External links 
 
 
 

1941 births
2021 deaths
French film actresses
People from Oujda
20th-century French actresses
French people of Spanish descent
Deaths from cancer in France
Deaths from pancreatic cancer
Nathalie